Dhiraj (Patience) is a Bollywood social film. It was released in 1942. The film was directed by Chaturbhuj Doshi for Ranjit Movietone. Gyan Dutt was the music director, with lyrics by Pandit Indra. The cast included Sitara Devi, Ishwarlal, Kesari, Nurjehan.

Dhiraj was doing successful business at the box-office when it was banned by the British government on the request of the Advisors to the governors. "They had grown intolerant of introduction of symbols like pictures of national leaders in films".

Cast
 Sitara Devi
 Ishwarlal
 Kesari
 Nurjehan
 Khatoon
 dhiraj
Rajkumari

Soundtrack
The music was composed by Gyan Dutt and the lyricist was Pandit Indra. The singers were Ishwar Lal, Gyan Dutt, Nur Jehan, Kesari.

Songlist

References

External links
 

1942 films
1940s Hindi-language films
Films scored by Gyan Dutt
Indian black-and-white films
Films directed by Chaturbhuj Doshi